The Declaration and Address was written by Thomas Campbell in 1809.  It was first published in Washington, Pennsylvania in 1809.  It was the founding document for the Christian Association of Washington, a religious association that was a precursor to the Restoration Movement. In many ways, Thomas Campbell was before his time. He had an ecumenical spirit long before the ecumenical movement began. The Declaration and Address is a testimony to his appeal for Christian unity.

Historical background

Thomas Campbell

Thomas Campbell (1763–1854) began his career as a Presbyterian minister.  After serving in Ireland for a while, he migrated to the American frontier in 1807.  A number of his associates from Ireland lived in Pennsylvania, and the Presbyterian church accepted his request to be stationed in Pennsylvania.  He had high expectations for the American frontier; he felt it represented a new life and a new era for the church.  As such, he was often seen as an unorthodox minister.  His position as a minister under the Presbyterian Synod of Pennsylvania only lasted 2 years.  He was reprimanded for certain "irregularities," including offering communion to Presbyterians outside of his Synod's jurisdiction.

Campbell continued his ministerial practices despite the Synod's disciplinary actions.  Both his conflict with the Presbyterians and his desire for a united church led him to organize the Christian Association of Washington.  This organization's main purpose was promoting  It was Campbell's hope that the Association would instigate a religious reformation. While this did not occur immediately, the Association did lead directly to the Restoration movement and the formation of the Disciples of Christ, who have been a continuing force for reformation and ecumenism.

Christian Association of Washington and beyond

The Christian Association of Washington consisted of Thomas Campbell and 21 of his associates.  During their second meeting, the committee decided that a document should be drafted outlining the purpose and function of the Association. The Declaration and Address was drafted by Campbell and read at a special meeting in September 1809. Ideally, this association, which promoted "simple evangelical Christianity," would also create similar associations elsewhere.  The founders' vision was that a grassroots movement would spring up and spread from the Eastern states to the vast expanses of the Western frontier, ushering in a brand new age for the church.

These grand expectations were never fulfilled.  The Christian Association of Washington quickly abandoned the title "association" on May 4, 1811, becoming the Brush Run Church.  The Declaration and Address had passed with little notice from the greater world.  Similarly, the Christian Association of Washington was simply not accepted in the religious realm.  Since their experiment failed to produce the desired results, Thomas Campbell (along with his more influential son Alexander) felt that they needed to become an independent church for their dreams to be realized.  In many ways, this left the Declaration portion of the Declaration and Address obsolete, but the Address still maintained its rhetorical strength.  Thus ended the short life of the Christian Association of Washington.

Content

The Declaration and Address of the Christian Association of Washington is divided into the Declaration, the Address, and the Appendix. The document is written in the style of early 19th century American religious literature, making it difficult for many to read. Paragraphs sometimes stretch on for pages at a time, while the text is unfortunately void of any subheadings. This makes Knofel Staton's 1976 paraphrase of this document particularly helpful.

Declaration
The Declaration was intended to describe the form and function of the Christian Association.  It begins with a brief statement revealing their personal religious conviction.   It is clear that Thomas Campbell, as well as the founders of the Christian Association, believed that scripture revealed one divinely inspired truth from which the early church could be recreated.  They felt "divinely bound" to see that truth was given to the masses.  This was the reason they founded the Christian Association of Washington.  In the Declaration, Campbell described the function of the Christian Association in 9 points, outlined below in both Campbell's original text (modified for readability) and Staton's paraphrase.

Address
The Address is the bulk of Campbell's argumentation, culminating in 13 propositions approximately two-thirds of the way through it.  It is here that Thomas Campbell writes his argument calling for the unification of the catholic (universal) church.  The Address begins with the following:

"To all that love our Lord Jesus Christ, in sincerity, throughout all the Churches, the following Address is most respectfully submitted.     Dearly Beloved Brethren, That it is the grand design and native tendency of our holy religion to reconcile and unite men to God, and to each other, in truth and love, to the glory of God, and their own present and eternal good, will not, we presume, be denied, by and of the subjects of Christianity."

Campbell then spends considerable time describing the current crisis facing the church.  Continuing with this theme of uniting "men to God, and to each other, in truth and love," he argues that a divided church is hardly a proclamation of the gospel.  "Campbell discourses on ecclesial schism as outright sin, and presupposes that the urgent summons to Christian unity is not his own but belongs to the whole church."

He continues, "Are not such the visible effects of our sad divisions, even in this otherwise happy country. Say, dear brethren, are not these things so? Is it not then your incumbent duty to endeavor, by all Scriptural means, to have those evils remedied. Who will say that it is not?" This task of uniting the church falls not on the shoulders of the Christian Association of Washington, but on the church at large.  If this is done, then the church will certainly begin a new era.  In many ways, the Declaration and Address has Zionist expectations of biblical proportions.  Campbell believed that God ordained America as a new promised land, in which God's kingdom be renewed, for "then should our eyes soon behold the prosperity of Zion; we should soon see Jerusalem a quiet habitation." If the Churches unite as one, then they will be able to take the gospel to the vast expanses of the unreached west.

Campbell continues using such "Promised Land" terminology, specifically terminology reminiscent of the conquest.  "'Union in Truth' is our motto. The Divine word is our standard; in the Lord's name do we display our banners." In a metaphorical way, the Western frontier of the 19th century was a new Promised Land where they would take the banners of union in truth to victory.  Historically, these grand expectations for the church matched similar expectations for the greater political realm in the United States of America in the early 19th century.

Campbell presents 13 propositions for the reformation which he expected would follow suit.  These clearly display his heart for Christian unity.  They are outlined below in both the original Declaration and Address (modified for readability) and Stanton's paraphrase.  Both are summarized because of length.

The homepage for the Christian Churches/Churches of Christ summarized these 13 propositions into the following 5 principles:
1. That the church of Christ upon earth is essentially, intentionally, and constitutionally one; consisting of all those in every place that profess their faith in Christ and obedience to him in all things according to the Scriptures. . . .2. That . . . there ought to be no schisms, no uncharitable divisions among [local congregations].3. That . . . nothing ought to be inculcated upon Christians as articles of faith; nor required of them as terms of communion; but what is expressly taught and enjoined upon them, in the Word of God.4. That . . . the New Testament is as perfect a constitution for the worship, discipline, and government of the New Testament church, and as perfect a rule of the particular duties of its members, as the Old Testament was for the worship, discipline, and government of the Old Testament church. . . .5. That . . . [no] human authority [has] power to impose new commands or ordinances upon the church, which our Lord Jesus Christ has not enjoined.

Appendix
The Appendix comprises approximately half of the Declaration and Address.  Here, Campbell confronts possible points of contention.  While presenting nothing new, he expands on previous arguments hoping to clear up possible misunderstandings.  For example, Campbell and his associates may have been viewed as anti-creedal, but they did not reject all use of creeds.  They merely viewed creeds as instruments of study rather than lenses of interpretation.

As to creeds and confessions, although we may appear to our brethren to oppose them, yet this is to be understood only in so far as they oppose the unity of the Church, by containing sentiments not expressly revealed in the word of God; or, by the way of using them, become the instruments of a human or implicit faith, or oppress the weak of God's heritage. Where they are liable to none of those objections, we have nothing against them. It is the abuse and not the lawful use of such compilations that we oppose.

Another point of interest in the Appendix is Campbell's discussion of the reason for varying interpretations of scripture.  It is his understanding that scripture reveals a single distinct and clear truth.  Despite this single distinct and clear truth, generations of Christians have often disagreed with how to apply different portions of scripture.  Rather than acknowledging that scripture is sometimes ambiguous and difficult to understand, he framed his response in the language of Romans 14, the weak and the strong believer.  It is his belief that further exposure to scripture, as well as greater discussion with the saints, will reveal God's clear truth.  This truth, as revealed in scripture, is the sole basis for restoring the true church.  In short, if unity if to happen, it must be done around the scriptures.

It was not Campbell's intention to create more schisms and divisions in the church, only to offer them a way in which the church might unite.  Thomas Campbell ends the Appendix with this statement revealing his character and humility:
"Thus, upon the whole, have we briefly attempted to point out those evils, and to prevent those mistakes which we earnestly desire to see obviated for the general peace, welfare, and prosperity of the Church of God.  Our dear brethren, giving credit to our sincere and well-meant intention, will charitably excuse the imperfections of our humble performance, and by the assistance of their better judgment correct those mistakes, and supply those deficiencies which in a first attempt of this nature may have escaped our notice"

Analysis

Argumentation and use of scripture
Thomas Campbell was highly educated for a preacher of the 18th century.  He studied at Glasgow university under George Jardine, who was a friend and student of Thomas Reid.  As such, Thomas Campbell employed a highly developed rhetoric in the Declaration and Address clearly influenced by Common Sense Hermeneutics (as discussed below).

His use of scripture falls into 3 categories:
 References to scripture using citations (Ezek. 44:6-9), but without actually quoting the verse.
  Quotations taken from scripture, with or without a citation.
 Allusion to scripture without using a citation or quotation.

The allusions to scripture are woven throughout the entire Declaration and Address.  It is clear that he assumed the readers to be well acquainted with the Bible.  He refers to a wide array of books from both the Old Testament and New Testament (21 from the OT and 25 from the NT). His favorite Old Testament references are the Prophets and the Psalms.  His favorite New Testament section, as noted above, comes from Romans 14-15.  He frequently alludes to the strong and the weak and opens the Declaration with an allusion to the individual judgment inherent in humanity (Rom. 14:3,10).  In addition to Romans, Campbell frequents references to Zion.  Zion, the mountain of the Lord, shall be rebuilt here in America.  Now is the set time, a new time ordained by God.  Campbell uses a rhetoric that states this as fact, and then employs a technique that encourages the ministers to take part in what God has already ordained.

Surely, then, the time to favor her is come; even the set time. And is it not said that Zion shall be built in troublous times? Have not greater efforts been made, and more done, for the promulgation of the Gospel among the nations, since the commencement of the French Revolution, than had been for many centuries prior to that event? And have not the Churches, both in Europe and America, since that period, discovered a more than usual concern for the removal of contentions, for the healing of divisions...? Should we not, then, be excited by these considerations to concur with all our might, to help forward this good work;

Common sense hermeneutics
Thomas Campbell was heavily influenced by the teachings of John Locke (specifically Locke's Essay Concerning Human Understanding) and common sense philosophy. In the 18th and 19th centuries, common sense philosophy was a powerful rhetoric.  Its philosophy is based on the collective sense ("common sense") of humanity.  That which is universally agreed to be right and true is, in fact, right and true. In the 18th century, common sense philosophy was applied to the principle of hermeneutics, or the interpretation of texts.  This "common sense hermeneutic," one that allowed for individuals to approach and understand scripture directly, meshed well with the ideals of the American frontier. It was also combined with the rationalism of the Enlightenment, namely that reason was the epitome of the philosophical endeavor and that scholars can systematically figure out the mysteries of the world.  This blending of the common sense hermeneutic and the rationalism of the Enlightenment created a distinctive understanding of scripture that may be outlined in the following principles:
God is revealed in God's Holy Word, namely scripture, and that He reveals in it one single truth.
God is also revealed in the collective intellect of humanity, so that when the people of God endeavor to study the scriptures together, God's one truth will be understood clearly and plainly.
This very systematic approach to the study of scripture became foundational for the Restoration Movement.  Each person is entitled to examine the scriptures for him/herself.  This allows for varied interpretations, while simultaneously giving the power of interpretation back to the local congregation.

Criticisms
The primary criticism of the Declaration and Address concerns the conflict between unity and restoration.  These two principles, which run throughout the document, "have been seen as in tension with each other, if not contradictory, and consequently the source of faction within the movement."

Historic designation
In 1994, the Pennsylvania Historical and Museum Commission installed a historical marker noting the historic importance of the publishing of the document.

See also
Christian Church (Disciples of Christ)

References

External links
Declaration and Address - A complete digital copy of Thomas Campbell's Declaration and Address.
Declaration and Address - A complete digital copy of Thomas Campbell's Declaration and Address.
Knofel Staton's Declaration and Address - Knofel Staton's 1976 paraphrase of the Declaration and Address, set in modern English.

1809 non-fiction books
19th-century Christian texts
Christian Church (Disciples of Christ)
Churches of Christ
Nondenominational Christianity
Restoration Movement